Book*hug, formerly BookThug, is a literary press in Toronto, Canada, founded in 2003, which originally concentrated on experimental poetry and currently publishes contemporary books of literary fiction, literary nonfiction, literature in translation, and poetry by emerging and established writers. Jay MillAr is the founder and publisher.

The company has published award-winning books of Canadian poetry, including Phil Hall's Killdeer, which won the Governor General's Award for English-language poetry in 2011.

In 2018, their name was changed to "Book*hug" due to the controversial nature of the word "thug" and "a question about cultural appropriation".

References

Companies based in Toronto
Publishing companies established in 2003
Book publishing companies of Canada
Small press publishing companies
Canadian poetry
Literary publishing companies
Poetry publishers